András Bíró (born 20 October 1925) is a Hungarian journalist, journal editor, environment activist and human rights activist.

Life and career
Bíró was born of Hungarian and Serbian parents in Sofia on 20 October 1925. He was a founding editor of the UN family journals "Ceres and "Mazingira. He founded the organization Hungarian Foundation for Self-Reliance in 1990. In 1995, he and the organisation were awarded the Right Livelihood Award "for their resolute defence of Hungary's Roma minority and effective efforts to aid their self-development."

References

1925 births
Living people
Hungarian activists
Hungarian editors
Hungarian journalists